The Luge competition at the 2002 Winter Olympic Games was held at Utah Olympic Park in Park City. Three events were staged, taking place from 10 to 14 February.

Medal summary

Medal table

Events

Participating NOCs 
Twenty-five nations competed in the luge events at Salt Lake City.

References

External links
Results Book – Luge

 
2002
2002 Winter Olympics events
2002 in luge